Unne or UNNE can refer to:

Dr. Unne, a minor character in Final Fantasy
Unei, also known as Unne, a character in Final Fantasy III
National University of the Northeast, an Argentine university